Greg Craven may refer to:

 Greg Craven (academic) (born 1958), Professor of Law and vice-chancellor at the Australian Catholic University
 Greg Craven (teacher), American high school science teacher and climate change author